Steamboat Springs is a home rule municipality that is the county seat and the most populous municipality of Routt County, Colorado, United States. Steamboat Springs is the principal city of the Steamboat Springs, CO Micropolitan Statistical Area. According to 2019 census data, the city had an estimated population of 13,214.

The city is a winter ski resort destination, including the Steamboat Ski Resort on Mount Werner in the Park Range just east of the town and the much smaller Howelsen Hill Ski Area. Steamboat Springs has produced more athletes for the Winter Olympics than any other town in North America.

Steamboat Springsknown colloquially as "The 'Boat"is located in the upper valley of the Yampa River, along U.S. Highway 40, just west of the Continental Divide and Rabbit Ears Pass. It is located approximately three hours northwest of Denver by car, and sits near the Wyoming border. It is served by Steamboat Springs Airport (general aviation) and commercial service at nearby Yampa Valley Airport.

History 

The area surrounding Steamboat Springs was originally inhabited by the Yampatika band of the Utes, who hunted in the valley during the summer. Trappers began to move through the area during the first decades of the 19th century. James Harvey Crawford, the founder of Steamboat Springs, first arrived in the spring of 1874. The Crawford family moved there in 1876, and for the first five years were the sole permanent white residents of the town. The native Utes were forcibly removed from the area to a reservation in Utah by the U.S. Army starting in 1879. Milestones in the development of the pioneer town included the first sawmill in 1873, incorporation of the town in 1900, and the arrival of the railroad in 1909. The economy of the region was originally based on ranching and mining, which still have a large presence in the county.

Steamboat is home to natural hot springs that are located throughout the area (see Geography). Upon first hearing a chugging sound, early trappers believed that a steamboat was coming down the river. When the trappers saw that there was no steamboat, and that the sound was coming from a hot spring, they decided to name the spring Steamboat Spring.

Originally, skiing was the only method of transportation during harsh and snowy Rocky Mountain winters. In turn, the popularity of skiing as a winter pastime catalyzed development of the town and other communities all over the Rocky Mountains. In 1913, Carl Howelsen, a Norwegian, moved to town and introduced ski jumping. Howelsen built the first jump on Howelsen Hill, now part of the Howelsen Ski Area. He also founded the annual Winter Carnival, a celebration still held each winter. The festival includes ski racing and jumping, dog sledding, and chariot events down Lincoln Avenue, the city's main street. Light shows on both Mount Werner and Howelsen Hill are highlights. Howelsen also founded the Steamboat Springs Winter Sports Club and built the town's first ski jumps. The oldest continually operating ski area in North America, Howelsen Hill, now bears his name and is one of just three complete ski jumping complexes in the United States.

The Steamboat Ski Resort was largely established by two local men, Jim Temple and John Fetcher. Temple led the effort to develop the area. Fetcher, a local rancher, was the main designer and builder. The resort opened on what was then called Storm Mountain in 1963.

In 1974, The Industrial Company (TIC) was started in Steamboat Springs and has since grown into one of the largest industrial construction companies in the United States with revenues of approximately $2 billion in 2007. The company is one of the largest employers in Routt County and has more than 9,000 employees worldwide.
TIC - The Industrial Company was acquired by Kiewit Engineering and all operations except the Training Center moved elsewhere (Denver, etc.).
The main TIC complex on Routt County Road 129 has been acquired by Yampa Valley Electric Association as their new headquarters, with extensive renovation. This property provides ample areas for offices, vehicle maintenance, and construction laydown activities.

In 1993, the City Council of Steamboat Springs, Colorado conducted a poll of its residents to choose a new name for the bridge that crossed the Yampa River on Shield Drive. With 7,717 votes, the winning name was "James Brown Soul Center of the Universe Bridge". The bridge was officially dedicated in September 1993, and James Brown appeared at the ribbon-cutting ceremony for the event.

Historic buildings
Historic buildings in Steamboat Springs include:
 Christian Science Society, at 7th and Oak, was built of logs in 1934 and is now listed on the National Register of Historic Places.
 The Crawford House, at 12th and Crawford, was built of local stone in 1894 by the founder of Steamboat, James Harvey Crawford, and is now listed on the National Register of Historic Places.

Geography and climate

The Yampa Valley and surrounding area contain several geothermal hot springs. The city is named after the Steamboat Spring, located near the present-day library and the old train depot. The spring itself was so named because its bubbling sounded like a steamboat to early settlers.

Though there are no steamboats in the town, except for an allegorical "steamboat" playground in West Lincoln Park which was designed to resemble a steamboat and has since been mostly torn down, the area does offer hot springs that are open to the public.

The Yampa River flows through the middle of town, with several tributary creeks joining in town – Fish Creek, Spring Creek, Soda Creek, and more.

Climate

According to the Köppen Climate Classification system, Steamboat Springs has a warm-summer humid continental climate, abbreviated "Dfb" on climate maps.

Demographics

As of the census of 2010, there were 12,088 people, 5,201 households, and 2,275 families residing in the city. There were 9,966 housing units. The racial makeup of the city was 94% White, 0.6% Asian, 0.8% African American, 0.4% Native American, 0.1% Pacific Islander, 0.7% from other races, and 2.5% from two or more races. Hispanic or Latino of any race were 8.5% of the population.

There were 4,201 households, out of which 24.3% had children under the age of 18 living with them, 43.2% were married couples living together, 6.2% had a female householder with no husband present, and 46.6% were non-families. Additionally, 28.5% of all households were made up of individuals, and 2.5% had someone living alone who was 65 years of age or older. The average household size was 2.27 and the average family size was 2.81.

The median age of Steamboat's population was 36.5 years. By sex, the population was 54.2 percent male, 45.8 percent female.

The median income for a household in the city was $54,647, and the median income for a family was $65,685. Males had a median income of $35,536 versus $28,244 for females. The per capita income for the city was $31,695. About 2.7% of families and 7.2% of the population were below the poverty line, including 4.4% of those under age 18 and 3.1% of those age 65 or over.

Sports 

Steamboat Springs offers skiing opportunities and has been the locale for skiing competitions including the 1989 and 1990 Alpine Skiing World Cup.

The Yampa river is a location for water sports like fishing, rafting, tubing, and kayaking (playboating). The  grade II-III whitewater run through town ends with two surfable holes. One is called D-Hole; the other one—near the library, close to the Steamboat Spring—is named Charlie's Hole or C-Hole for short, after local kayaker Charlie Beavers (1981–2002). Beavers started kayaking at age 12, was the first to explore a number of rivers ("first descents"), and successfully contended in playboating competitions. He died in a non-boating accident in 2002. The hole and some kayaking events were dedicated to him.

Every year on the first weekend of June, Steamboat Springs organizes the Yampa River Festival. It includes a kayak rodeo (i.e., a playboating competition) which attracts national and international world class playboaters. Additional events include but are not limited to a downriver race which is Colorado's only upstream slalom race, and the Crazy River Dog Contest, in which dogs retrieve sticks from the river and may pass a whitewater section.

It lasted two ski seasons, closing in 1974.

Notable people 
 Debbie Armstrong (born 1963), alpine skier and Olympic gold medalist; lives in Steamboat Springs
 Chris Baumann (born 1987), rugby union player, prop for Leicester Tigers and USA Eagles
 Nelson Carmichael (born 1965), mogul skier and Olympic bronze medalist; born in Steamboat Springs
 James Harvey Crawford (1845–1930), founder of Steamboat Springs; soldier, farmer, pioneer, cattleman, miner, land developer, and politician
 Shannon Dunn-Downing (born 1972), freestyle snowboarder, Olympic bronze medalist and 4-time Winter X-Games medalist; raised in Steamboat Springs
 Taylor Fletcher (born 1990), Nordic combined skier; competed in his first Olympic Winter Games in Vancouver in 2010
Arielle Gold (born 1996), Olympic bronze medalist and World Champion snowboarder; born in Steamboat Springs
 Taylor Gold (born 1993), Olympian snowboarder; born in Steamboat Springs
 Carroll Hardy (born 1933), former Major League Baseball player; resides in Steamboat Springs
 Billy Kidd (born 1943), alpine skier and Olympic silver medalist; moved to Steamboat Springs in 1970 and serves as Director of Skiing for Steamboat Ski Resort
 Caroline Lalive (born 1979), alpine skier and two-time Olympian; attended Lowell Whiteman School and lives in Steamboat Springs
 Todd Lodwick (born 1976), Nordic combined skier, Olympic silver medalist and two-time World champion; born in Steamboat Springs
 Verne Lundquist (born 1940), television sportscaster; resides in Steamboat Springs
 Travis Mayer (born 1982), freestyle skier and Olympic silver medalist; moved to Steamboat Springs to attend the Lowell Whiteman School
 Carey McWilliams (1905–1980), author, editor, lawyer known for progressive ideas; born in Steamboat Springs
 Robin Olds (1922–2007), ace fighter pilot and WWII/Vietnam fighter group commander; retired in Steamboat
 Ryan Max Riley (born 1979), freestyle skier and humorist; attended Lowell Whiteman School in Steamboat
 Reese Roper (born 1973), singer and songwriter; born in Steamboat Springs
 Ryan Serhant, owns a home in Steamboat Springs
 Andrew Sisco (born 1983), baseball player; born in Steamboat Springs
 Johnny Spillane (born 1980), Nordic combined skier, three-time Olympic silver medalist and World champion; born in Steamboat Springs
 Steven Ray Swanson (born 1960), engineer and a NASA astronaut
 Alvin P. Wegeman (1927–2015), Nordic combined skier; helped to develop Steamboat Springs area for skiing
 Buddy Werner (1936–1964), Olympic alpine skier who had Mount Werner named in his honor in 1965, following his death in an avalanche; born and raised in Steamboat Springs
 Gordon Wren (1919–1999), ski jumper; last lived and died in Steamboat Springs
 Trey Parker (born 1969), award-winning American actor, animator, writer, producer, director, and composer. He is most known for co-creating the animated television show South Park. Owns property to which he frequently vacations.

Transportation

Steamboat Springs Transit (SST)

Colorado CDOT Bustang / Snowstang

Yampa Valley Regional Airport

Sister cities

  Saas-Fee, Valais, Switzerland
  San Martín de los Andes, Neuquén, Argentina

See also

Outline of Colorado
Index of Colorado-related articles
State of Colorado
Colorado cities and towns
Colorado municipalities
Colorado counties
Fish Creek Falls
Yampa River Botanic Park

References

External links

 
 City of Steamboat Springs
 Steamboat Springs Chamber of Commerce
 
 Strawberry Park Hot Springs Photographs
 Tread of Pioneers Museum

 
Cities in Routt County, Colorado
Cities in Colorado
County seats in Colorado
Hot springs of Colorado
Bodies of water of Routt County, Colorado